Stanisław Sieniawski was a Polish footballer playing as a defender

He is widely considered one of Stal's legends, as in 1975, at the age of 26, he won the Polish Cup and promotion to the top division, which meant he played in the UEFA Cup Winners' Cup the following season too; hailing the greatest successes of the club to this day. He played in 37 first division matches scoring 3 goals. He died on 16 September 2020 at the age of 71.

References

1949 births
2020 deaths
People from Rzeszów
Polish footballers
Association football defenders